Ford Center at The Star is a 12,000-seat indoor stadium located in Frisco, Texas. Its main use is as the Dallas Cowboys' practice facility. It is also used for Whataburger's Friday Night Stars, an event every Friday showcasing Frisco Independent School District high school varsity football. The synthetic turf is Hellas Matrix Turf with Helix Technology. The field's dimensions can also be marked for and accommodate a regulation soccer pitch and lacrosse field.

History
The project was announced in 2013 as a partnership between the City of Frisco and the Dallas Cowboys as part of the "$5 Billion Mile" in Frisco Station, Texas. The Ford Center is part of a 91-acre development called The Star, which includes the Dallas Cowboys' team headquarters and training facility. The Dallas Cowboys decided to move to Frisco from Valley Ranch, Texas, and now uses The Star for their practice games. Hosting a 300-room Omni Hotel, the Dallas Cowboys Ring of Honor Walk, and retail and restaurant space, it is used for multiple events and football games. Asides from the main stadium, it features practice fields and a sports training complex called the "Baylor Scott & White Sports Therapy & Research center for sports medicine".

In 2015, the Cowboys and Ford Motor Company signed a ten-year deal for naming rights.

Dallas Rattlers
On November 16, 2017, Major League Lacrosse announced it was relocating the Rochester Rattlers to Frisco and the Ford Center as the Dallas Rattlers. The Rattlers, the first professional team to play their games in the facility, played their first home game at the Ford Center on April 29, 2018, against the Denver Outlaws. The Rattlers won the game in overtime, 15–14 with a reported 7,217 attendance. The Rattlers ceased operations after the 2019 season.

Texas Revolution
On December 18, 2018, the Texas Revolution of Champions Indoor Football announced they had signed a three-year lease to play home games at the Ford Center beginning with the 2019 season. However, after three home games in its first season in the arena, the team was evicted. On May 9, the team announced it had ceased operations after the ownership failed to back its financial obligations.

Other events

Major League Lacrosse (MLL) hosted the 2017 Steinfeld Cup, the league championship game for the 2017 season at the Ford Center. The MLL later moved the Rochester Rattlers to the facility permanently for the 2018 season.
Conference USA held its men and women's basketball tournaments from 2018 through 2023 at The Star in partnership with the University of North Texas, the Dallas Cowboys, and the city of Frisco.
 On June 16, 2018, the venue hosted a welterweight world championship boxing match with Errol Spence Jr. successfully defending his IBF title against challenger Carlos Ocampo. On February 2, 2019, Eleider Álvarez and Sergey Kovalev fought at the arena for the WBO light heavyweight title, for which Kovalev regained his title after a hard-fought and rightfully deserved win.
 The Alliance of American Football (AAF) was scheduled to hold its 2019 championship game at The Star on April 27, but wasn't played after the league suspended operations on April 2. Sam Boyd Stadium in Las Vegas was originally announced as the host site for the game in October 2018, but the venue was changed in March.

References

External links
Official website

Dallas Cowboys
Ford Motor Company
Sports in Frisco, Texas
Sports venues in the Dallas–Fort Worth metroplex
Major League Lacrosse venues
Premier Lacrosse League venues
Sports venues completed in 2016
2016 establishments in Texas
Lacrosse venues in the United States
Soccer venues in Texas
American football venues in the Dallas–Fort Worth metroplex
Basketball venues in Texas
Boxing venues in the United States